Susan Stinson is an American writer. She has published four novels and a collection of poetry.

Born in Texas and raised in Colorado, she currently lives in Northampton, Massachusetts, where she is writer in residence at the Forbes Library. She is an out lesbian.

Awards
Stinson was awarded the Jim Duggins Outstanding Mid-Career Novelists' Prize in 2011. Her novel Venus of Chalk was a Lambda Literary Award finalist and was named one of the ten best books of the year by Publishing Triangle, and she is a past winner of the Independent Book Publishers Association's Benjamin Franklin Award for Fiction.

Works
Belly Songs (1993)
Fat Girl Dances with Rocks (1994)
Martha Moody (1995)
Venus of Chalk (2004)
Spider in a Tree (2013)

References

External links
Susan Stinson

American women novelists
American women poets
Novelists from Texas
Novelists from Massachusetts
American lesbian writers
Living people
20th-century American novelists
21st-century American novelists
American LGBT poets
American LGBT novelists
20th-century American women writers
21st-century American women writers
20th-century American poets
21st-century American poets
Year of birth missing (living people)